The military ranks of the German Empire were the ranks used by the military of the German Empire. It inherited the various traditions and military ranks of its constituent states.

Ranks of the Imperial German Army
The Imperial German Army from 1871 to 1914 inherited the various traditions and military ranks of its constituent states, thus becoming a truly federal armed service.

Enlisted ranks
 Musketeer (Prussian army infantry regiments), Infantryman (Bavarian army infantry regiments), Soldier (Saxon army infantry regiments), Gunner (foot artillery), Pioneer (pioneer branch). Other unit-specific enlisted ranks were: Fusilier, Grenadier, Huntsman otherwise Light-Infantryman, Dragoon, Hussar, Cuirassier, Uhlan, Fusilier Guard, Grenadier Guard, Wehrmann (Landwehr), etc.
 Senior Lance Corporal; established in the Prussian Army from 1846 to 1853, reestablished in 1859, then in foot artillery only, replacing the artillery Bombardier rank that had been introduced in 1730.

Additionally, the following voluntary enlistees were distinguished:
 One-Year Volunteer Enlistee: despite the name, one-year volunteers were actually conscripts who served a short-term form of active military service, open for enlistees up to the age of 25. Such enlisted soldiers were usually high school graduates, who would opt to serve a one-year term rather than the regular two or three-year conscription term, with free selection of their chosen military service branch and unit, but throughout were obligated to equip and subsist themselves at entirely their own cost. In today's monetary value, this could at bare minimum cost some 10,000 euro, which purposely reserved this path open to sons from mostly affluent social class families wishing to pursue the Reserve-Officer path; it was the specific intention of Wilhelm II that such Reserve-Officer career path should only be open to members of so-called "officer-material" social classes. On absolving their primary recruit training, those aspiring to become Reserve-Officers would have to qualify and achieve suitability for promotion to the  rank and then would continue to receive further specialized instruction until the end of their one-year term, usually attaining and leaving as surplus Corporals (Reservists), with the opportunity to advance further as reservists. Eligibility for this specific one-year path of military service was a privilege approved upon examining the enlistee's suitability and academic qualifications.
 Long-Term Volunteer Enlistee "Capitulant": enlisted soldiers who had already absolved their regular two or three-year military conscription term and had now volunteered to continue serving for further terms, minimum was 4 years, generally up to 12 years.

This distinction was never removed throughout their military service nor during any rank grade advancements.

Non-commissioned officers /

Junior NCOs (NCOs without Sword Knot) / 
 Corporal/Sub-Officer
 Sergeant

Senior NCOs (NCOs with Sword Knot) / 
 Sergeant Major 2nd class (Infantry: , Cavalry and Artillery: Vizewachtmeister/Vice-Wachtmeister) – rank held by reserve officer candidates after they passed lieutenant's examination
 Sergeant-Major (Infantry: Feldwebel (i.e. : CSM officially listed on the regiment's payroll, i.e. ), Cavalry and Artillery: )

Warrant officers and officer cadets
 Cadet (ranking between Sergeant and Vizefeldwebel) – served as cadets in the various military academies and schools.
 Deputy Officer (ranking above )
 Uncommissioned Lieutenant (a permanent rank as youngest 2nd Lieutenant, with Lieutenant's pay, but without officer's commission and still member of the NCO's Mess until 1917, when he became eligible for the Officer's Mess)

Officer corps
Critics long believed that the Army's officer corps was heavily dominated by Junker aristocrats, so that commoners were shunted into low-prestige branches, such as the heavy artillery or supply. However, by the 1890s, the top ranks were opened to highly talented commoners.

Captains and subalterns /  und

Field Officers /

General Officers /

Naval ranks and ratings
The Imperial German Navy's rank and rating system combined that of Prussia's with the navies of other northern states.

Flag Officers

Naval officers

Officer cadets

Warrant Officers

Petty Officers

Seamen

Notes

References

External links
 

 
Ranks
Ranks
Ranks